Lucy Elizabeth Dacus (born May 2, 1995) is an American singer-songwriter and producer. Originally from Richmond, Virginia, Dacus attracted attention with her debut album No Burden (2016), which led to a deal with Matador Records. Her second album, Historian, was released in 2018 to further critical acclaim. Dacus's third studio album, Home Video, was released in 2021.

In addition to her solo work, Dacus is also a member of the indie supergroup boygenius (formed in 2018), alongside Phoebe Bridgers and Julien Baker.

Early life
Dacus was adopted as an infant and grew up in Mechanicsville, Virginia, a suburb of Richmond. She is of Uzbek and Irish descent. Her adoptive mother is a professional pianist and music teacher, and her adoptive father is a graphic designer. Dacus had an early interest in music, and bought her first guitar, an Ibanez, from Craigslist when she was in middle school. After graduating from Maggie L. Walker Governor's School in 2013, she began studying film at Virginia Commonwealth University, but left to avoid student debt and the "feeling of being misunderstood" in her university program. Prior to becoming a full-time musician, she was employed with Richmond Camera as an editor for children's school photos. During this time, she wrote approximately 30 songs, nine of which would comprise the tracklist of No Burden.

Career

2015–2018: No Burden and Historian
Dacus first performed in New York City in March 2015. Her first single, "I Don't Wanna Be Funny Anymore," premiered in November 2015. Her debut album, No Burden, was produced in Nashville by her hometown friends, Berklee College of Music graduate Collin Pastore and Oberlin Conservatory of Music graduate Jacob Blizard; it was recorded at the request of Blizard for a school project. The album was originally released digitally on CD, and on vinyl via Richmond's EggHunt Records on February 26, 2016. Dacus was then signed to Matador Records, who re-released the album on September 9, 2016. In the same year she performed at Lollapalooza, in Chicago's Grant Park and made her national television debut on CBS This Morning. She recorded a Tiny Desk Concert for NPR the same weekend. In October 2016 she played the London Calling festival in Amsterdam, as a replacement for The Duke Spirit, who were forced to cancel.

Dacus's second album, entitled Historian, was released on March 2, 2018. Like its predecessor, it was met with widespread critical acclaim. Writing for Pitchfork, Sasha Geffen praised its nuance and sensitivity: "It’s not an easy album to wear out. It lasts, and it should, given that so many of its lyrics pick at time, and the way time condenses around deep emotional attachments to other people." Rolling Stone rated the album 4/5 stars, as did NME. Historian, like No Burden, was recorded in Nashville, at Trace Horse Studio, in a similar collaborative effort by Lucy Dacus, Jacob Blizard, and Collin Pastore.

2018–present: Boygenius, 2019 EP, and Home Video

In 2018, Dacus, along with Phoebe Bridgers and Julien Baker, formed the group Boygenius. They released three songs in August 2018 and subsequently announced an EP and tour. The EP, titled boygenius, came out on October 26, 2018. In January 2023, a debut studio album titled The Record was announced by the supergroup to be released March 31, 2023.

To coincide with Valentine's Day 2019, Dacus released a cover of "La Vie en rose", the first in a planned series of songs commemorating major holidays.

In 2021, Dacus announced her third album, Home Video, which was released on June 25. She performed one of the album's singles "Hot & Heavy" on The Late Show with Stephen Colbert on April 13. On November 10, Dacus released her single "Thumbs Again", a re-release of her song "Thumbs" with additional instrumentation, alongside the announcement of 2022 US tour dates. 

On February 2, 2022, Dacus released a single "Kissing Lessons", which was accompanied by a music video.
 During 2022, Dacus toured Europe, Australia and America.

Dacus released a music video for the song "Night Shift" for the five year anniversary of her album "Historian" in March of 2023

Activism
After Texas' new abortion law went into effect on September 1, 2021, Dacus announced on Twitter that all the money she makes at her upcoming shows in Texas "will be going towards abortion funds." She also informed her fans to bring extra money to her Houston and San Antonio shows for the donation to the abortion funds. During her Home Video Tour in July, 2022, Dacus announced that she and her support act, Camp Cope, would be donating tips from the merchandise stand to the organization Fund Abortion Not Police.

Personal life
Dacus was raised Christian but has since become irreligious. She describes herself as queer, and says that the terms bisexual or pansexual come closest to defining her sexuality. Dacus lived in Richmond, Virginia until late 2019. As of June 2021, she resides in Philadelphia.

Discography

Studio albums

Extended plays

Singles

Other appearances

Guest appearances

As part of Boygenius
 Boygenius (2018)
 Boygenius (Demos) (2020)
  The Record (2023)

Accolades

References

External links

 Official website

Living people
1995 births
American women singer-songwriters
Musicians from Richmond, Virginia
LGBT people from Virginia
American LGBT singers
21st-century American singers
Queer women
Boygenius members
Maggie L. Walker Governor's School for Government and International Studies alumni
Feminist musicians
21st-century American women
Singer-songwriters from Virginia
American people of Uzbek descent
American people of Irish descent